The 2011 G20 Cannes Summit was the sixth meeting of the G20 heads of government/heads of state in a series of on-going discussions about financial markets and the world economy.

The G20 forum is the avenue for the G20 economies to discuss, plan and monitor international economic
cooperation. While the summit achieved little progress on resolving the Eurozone crisis and providing concrete measures to addressing global financial imbalances, it did produce some tangible results, including the adoption of the Cannes Action Plan for Growth and Jobs, the launch of the Agricultural Market Information System (AMIS) and the endorsement of an Action Plan on Food Price Volatility and Agriculture.

Priorities
France put agriculture and food security at the heart of the G20 priorities. Around this broad theme, it divided the priorities of the Summit into six areas:
 Reform the International Monetary System.
 Strengthen financial regulation, especially in non-banking financial institutions as well as regulation concerning financial market integrity and transparency.
 Reduce excessive commodity price volatility and enhance food security.
 Support employment and strengthen the social dimension of globalization.
 Fight corruption, for example by ensuring that the Anti-Corruption Action Plan adopted in the 2010 G20 Seoul summit will produce concrete results and real progress starting in 2011.
 Support infrastructure development and enhance food security in the most vulnerable countries.

Outcomes
The Summit took place in the aftermath of the 2007-08 financial crisis and in the midst of the evolving Eurozone crisis. Against this background, the outcomes of the Summit can be considered as insufficient in providing clear solutions for restoring and strengthening the global economy.

However, the Summit did result in a number of initiatives, most notably in the area of agriculture and food security. Especially the launch of the Agricultural Market Information System (AMIS) and the endorsement of an Action Plan on Food Price Volatility and Agriculture are tangible steps to addressing the world agriculture and food challenge. The G20 Summit also tasked the GEO Global Agricultural Monitoring (GEOGLAM) initiative to produce and disseminate improved forecasts of agricultural production through the use of earth observations.

Attendance

Attendance at the Cannes summit included leaders and representatives of the core members of the G20, which comprises 19 countries and the European Union which is represented by its two governing bodies, the European Council and the European Commission. Representatives of other nations and regional organizations were also invited to take part in the summit.

Protests
At the summit protesters donned Robin Hood caps and demanded a tax on international financial transactions in order to provide aid to poor countries instead of catering to banking and other financial institutions. They also chanted slogans in opposition to "corporate greed" and supported a counter-G20 summit, "People First, Not Finance", organised by labour unions and NGOs such as Greenpeace and Oxfam. Though police reported 5,500 were part of the protests, the organisers estimated the number of protesters at 12,000. The riot police and helicopters limited the scope of the protests to a neighbourhood in the east of Nice, which was to host the alternative summit as well as the protests. Both Cannes and Nice also tightened security, with 12,000 police personnel being deployed.

See also
 37th G8 summit

References

External links

 Official website
G20 website of the OECD
 G20 Information Centre
 Graphic: G20 is not simply the 20 largest economies

2011
2011 conferences
2011 in France
2011 in international relations
21st-century diplomatic conferences (Global)
Diplomatic conferences in France
Cannes
November 2011 events in France